Jane Toombs (died March 5, 2014) was an American writer. She wrote about 100 books, some of them under the pseudonyms Jane Anderson, Ellen Jamison, Diana Stuart and Olivia Sumner. Toombs was born in California and died in Ontonagon, Michigan.

References

Year of birth missing
American women novelists
2014 deaths
20th-century American novelists
21st-century American novelists
21st-century American women writers
20th-century American women writers
People from Ontonagon, Michigan